The EF 20–35mm lens is a wide-angle lens made by Canon Inc., with an EF mount. There are two models, an L-series 2.8L and a consumer-grade 3.5–4.5.

Table

Successor lenses
The 20-35mm lens was followed by two other L-series ultra-wide lenses:
 EF 17–35mm 2.8L
 EF 16–35mm 2.8L USM
 The EF 17–40mm 4L USM is another wide-angle lens that has a similar focal range

References

External links

20-35mm lens